is a railway station in the city of Ojiya, Niigata, Japan, operated by East Japan Railway Company (JR East).

Lines
Echigo-Iwasawa Station is served by the Iiyama Line, and is 88.1 kilometers from the starting point of the line at Toyono Station.

Station layout
The station consists of one ground-level side platform. The station formerly also had an island platform, which remains in place but is not in use. The station is unattended.

History
Echigo-Iwasawa Station opened on 15 June 1927. With the privatization of Japanese National Railways (JNR) on 1 April 1987, the station came under the control of JR East.

Surrounding area

See also
 List of railway stations in Japan

External links
 JR East station information 

Stations of East Japan Railway Company
Railway stations in Niigata Prefecture
Iiyama Line
Railway stations in Japan opened in 1927
Ojiya, Niigata